Cécile Wajsbrot (Paris, 21 July 1954) is a French-Jewish writer, novelist, essayist, translator and journalist. Wajsbrot studied comparative literature in Paris and then worked as a French teacher and radio editor. She has translated books from English and German into French, e.g. by Virginia Woolf, Suzan Wicks, Charles Olson, Gert Ledig and Wolfgang Büscher.

Works

Novels 
 Une vie à soi, Paris, Mercure de France, 1982
 Atlantique, Paris, Zulma, 1993
 Le Désir d'Équateur, Paris, Zulma, 1995.
 Mariane Klinger, Paris, Zulma, 1996 
 La Trahison, Paris, Zulma, 1997.
 Voyage à Saint-Thomas, Paris, Zulma, 1998.
 Nation par Barbès, Paris, Zulma, 2001.
 Nocturnes, Paris, Zulma, 2002.
 Caspar-Friedrich-Strasse, Paris, Zulma, 2002.
 Mémorial, Paris, Zulma, 2005.
 Conversations avec le maître, Paris, Denoël, 2007.
 L'Île aux musées, Paris, Denoël, 2008.
 L'Hydre de Lerne, Paris, Denoël, 2011.
 Sentinelles, Paris, Christian Bourgois, 2013.
 Totale Éclipse, Paris, Christian Bourgois, 2014
 Destruction, Paris, Le Bruit du temps, 2019.
 Nevermore, Paris, Le Bruit du temps, 2021.

Essays 
 Violet Trefusis, biographie, préface de François Mitterrand, Mercure de France, 1989
 Europe centrale, avec Sébastien Reichmann, Autrement
 L'Histoire à la lettre, avec Jacques Hassoun, Mentha, 1991
 Pour la littérature, Zulma, 1999
 Beaune-la-Rolande, Zulma, 2004 
 Une autobiographie allemande, avec Hélène Cixous, Christian Bourgois, 2016 .
 Berliner Ensemble, Éditions La Ville brûle, 2015

Translations 
 Un éclair dans les ténèbres, Abra Taylor, Presses de la Cité, 1984
 Des étoiles dans la mer, Laurie McBain, Presses de la Cité, 1984
 L'enfant qui parlait aux oiseaux, Hans Baumann, Teo Puebla, Atelier Rouge et Or, 1989
 Fabergé et les maîtres orfèvres russes, sous la direction de Gerard Hill ; textes de Gerard Hill, G. G. Smorodinova, Bella Lazarevna Ulianova ; traduit par Cécile Wajsbrot, avec la collab. technique de Léon Sas, Belfond, 1990
 Farce amère, Craig Nova, Quai Voltaire, 1991
 The Player, Michael Tolkin, L'Archipel, 1992
 Tokyo séisme : 60 secondes qui vont changer le monde, Peter Handfield, Autrement, 1992
 Les Vagues, Virginia Woolf, Calmann-Lévy, 1993
 L'Héritière de Robinson, Jane Gardam, Autrement, 1994
 Le Musée de l'amour, Steve Weiner, Belfond, 1994
 Les Carnets perdus de Frans Hals, Michael Kernan, Belfond, 1995
 L'Amour en classe célibataire, Angela Lambert, Autrement, 1996
 La Nuit des dragons, Jack Prelutsky, Grasset jeunesse, 1997
 Les Sorcières du lundi, Jack Prelutsky, Grasset jeunesse, 1997
 Tout chasseur veut savoir, Mikhaïl Iossel, Éditions Noir sur blanc, 1997
 Flibustiers, Violet Trefusis, Salvy, 1998
 Histoire de Suth, Peter Dickinson, Hachette jeunesse, 2001
 Le Monde perdu sous la mer, Arthur Conan Doyle, Hachette jeunesse, 2001
 Travelling : poèmes, Patricia Nolan, Le Castor Astral, 2001
 L'Attraction, Chérif Zananiri, EDP sciences, 2002
 Histoire de Ko, Peter Dickinson, Hachette jeunesse, 2002
 Histoire de Noli, Peter Dickinson, Hachette jeunesse, 2002
 Le Général des soldats de bois, Iain Lawrence, Hachette jeunesse, 2003
 Histoire de Mana, Peter Dickinson, Hachette jeunesse, 2003
 Sous les bombes, Gert Ledig, Zulma, 2003
 Après-guerre, Gert Ledig, Zulma, 2005
 Berlin-Moscou, un voyage à pied, Wolfgang Büscher, L'Esprit des péninsules, 2005
 Irène et Pénélope, Violet Trefusis, Autrement, 2005
 Allemagne, un voyage, Wolfgang Büscher, L'Esprit des péninsules, 2006
 Les Architectes, Stefan Heym, Zulma, 2008
 Kaltenburg, Marcel Beyer, Métailié, 2010
 Un été sans fin, Peter Kurzeck, Diaphanes, 2013
 Loin de la mer : à pied à travers les grandes plaines, Wolfgang Büscher, Librairie Vuibert, 2014
 Des phrases ailées et autres essais, Virginia Woolf, Le Bruit du temps, 2015
 Un printemps à Jérusalem, Wolfgang Büscher, Librairie Vuibert, 2016
 La Pensée écologique, Timothy Morton, Zulma, 2019

Awards and honors 
 2014: Eugen-Helmlé-Übersetzerpreis
 2016: Prix de l'Académie de Berlin
 2017: Member of the Deutsche Akademie für Sprache und Dichtung

Bibliography 
 Jan-Pieter Barbian: Cécile Wajsbrot. In: dsb. (Red.): Vive la littérature! Französische Literatur in deutscher Übersetzung. Hg. & Verlag Stadtbibliothek Duisburg  pp. 44f
 Roswitha Böhm und Margarete Zimmermann: Du silence à la voix – Studien zum Werk von Cécile Wajsbrot. V&R Unipress, Göttingen 2010 
 Philipp Glahé: Von der Relativität der Zeit. Familie und Werk der Schriftstellerin Cécile Wajsbrot, in: Dokumente 4/2015,  S. 57–59. Zeitschrift für den deutsch-französischen Dialog / Revue du dialogue franco-allemand, .
 Leopoldo Domínguez: El Holocausto en la narrativa transfronteriza. In: José Javier Martos Ramos / María A. Borrueco Rosa (Hrsg.). Eine Geschichte, ein Roman, ein Märchen. Miscelánea de estudios in memoriam Nathalie Zimmermann (Colección Interlingua). Granada: Editorial Comares 2019, S. 31–42.

References

External links 
 
 
 Interview mit Cécile Wajsbrot, FAZ, 11 October 2009
 '"Osnabrück ist das verlorene Paradies, nur nicht für mich."', Gespräch mit Hélène Cixous. In: Sinn und Form 2, 2014, pages 214–222
 Profil Cécile Wajsbrot – website of Édition Zulma

1954 births
Living people
French people of Polish-Jewish descent
Writers from Paris
French novelists
French essayists
French translators
French journalists